Santa Lucía is a town located in the State of Mexico in Mexico. It belongs to the municipality of Zumpango, being located at its southeast end, within the facilities of the Felipe Ángeles International Airport.

See also
 Colonia Santa Lucía, a neighborhood in the town.

References

Populated places in the State of Mexico
Zumpango